LA UTI is an EP by Tobacco. It was released through Anticon on November 9, 2010. It includes guest appearances from Antipop Consortium, Doseone, Rob Sonic, Serengeti, Height, Icicle Frog, and Zackey Force Funk.

Critical reception
Chris Martins of The A.V. Club gave the EP a grade of A−, saying: "The only bummer comes with the realization that more than half the backing tracks are reduxed from Maniac Meat, but perhaps LA UTI is a bridge to something bigger." Larry Fitzmaurice of Pitchfork gave the EP a 6.5 out of 10, saying: "It seems like a lot of the guests here are trying to out-weird the material they're delivering over, which is precisely why Rob Sonic's appearance on 'Lick the Witch' works so well."

Track listing

Personnel
Credits adapted from liner notes.

 Tobacco – music, artwork
 Beans – vocals (1), lyrics (1)
 Earl Blaize – vocals (1), lyrics (1)
 Adam Drucker – vocals (2), lyrics (2)
 Rob Smith – vocals (3), lyrics (3)
 David Cohn – vocals (3), lyrics (4)
 Height – vocals (5), lyrics (5)
 Franklin Yaker – vocals (5)
 Icicle Frog – vocals (6), lyrics (6)
 Zackey Force Funk – vocals (7), lyrics (7)

References

External links
 

2010 EPs
Anticon EPs
Tobacco (musician) albums